Joseph Todd Siddall (born October 25, 1967) is a Canadian former professional baseball catcher. He played in Major League Baseball (MLB) for the Montreal Expos, Florida Marlins, and Detroit Tigers.

Professional career
Siddall was signed by the Montreal Expos as an amateur free agent in 1987. He played at various levels of their minor league organization before making his MLB debut in 1993. Siddall also appeared in the majors for the Expos in 1995, and became a free agent in the offseason. He signed with the Florida Marlins on November 30, 1995, and appeared in 16 MLB games during the 1996 season. He returned to the Expos minor league organization in 1997 before signing with the Detroit Tigers on December 2, 1997. He made his final MLB appearances in 1998 for the Tigers. In 1999 Siddall played in the Tigers minor league organization, and played his final season of professional baseball in 2000 with the Boston Red Sox minor league organization.

Broadcasting career
On March 1, 2014, Siddall was hired by the Toronto Blue Jays to work alongside Jerry Howarth during Blue Jays radio broadcasts. On February 28, 2018, it was announced that Siddall would move to the television broadcast, taking over for Gregg Zaun on Blue Jays Central.

He won the Canadian Screen Award for Best Sports Analysis or Commentary at the 10th Canadian Screen Awards in 2022.

References

External links

1967 births
Baseball people from Ontario
Canadian expatriate baseball players in the United States
Detroit Tigers players
Florida Marlins players
Living people
Major League Baseball broadcasters
Major League Baseball catchers
Major League Baseball players from Canada
Montreal Expos players
Sportspeople from Windsor, Ontario
Toronto Blue Jays announcers
Jamestown Expos players
Rockford Expos players
West Palm Beach Expos players
Harrisburg Senators players
Ottawa Lynx players
Toledo Mud Hens players
Charlotte Knights players
Pawtucket Red Sox players
Canadian Screen Award winners
Canadian television sportscasters